Squalidae, more commonly known as dogfish, dog sharks, or spiny dogfish, are one of several families of sharks categorized under Squaliformes, making it the second largest order of sharks, numbering 119 species across 7 families. Having earned their name after a group of fishermen reportedly observed the species chasing down smaller fish in dog-like packs, dogfish have slender, streamlined bodies, usually more compact in comparison to other species, and a pointed snout. Dogfish likewise have two dorsal fins, each with smooth spines, but no anal fin, and their skin is generally rough to the touch. The species therefore exhibits female-dominant sexual dimorphism.

Dogfish sharks have slate-grey or grey-brown skin with white dots that becomes paler (almost white) around the belly region. These sharks are characterized by teeth in upper and lower jaws similar in size; a caudal peduncle with lateral keels; the upper precaudal pit usually is present; and the caudal fin is without a  subterminal notch.

They are carnivorous, principally preying upon organisms smaller than themselves. Some of their prey include herring, mackerel, and capelin. In special cases, they may consume jellyfish and squid. Even at a young age, spiny dogfish pups may hunt fish two or three times their size. Unlike virtually all other shark species, dogfish sharks possess venom which coats their dorsal spines; this venom is mildly toxic to humans and would be harmful if the shark were to be mishandled. The livers and stomachs of the Squalidae contain the compound squalamine, which possesses the property of reduction of small blood vessel growth in humans. Dogfish sharks use their strong jaw and sharp teeth to consume their prey.

The spiny dogfish has broken several records in the areas of migration and gestation. This shark tends to be a highly migratory species: one shark was recorded as travelling  after being tagged in Washington state, United States, and found again later in Japan. In addition to its long distance migration, the spiny shark holds the record for longest gestation period of any other vertebrate at 22–24 months. Females produce eggs and give birth to live young that measure to be .

Taxonomy 
Dogfish are scientifically classified as the Squalidae family, categorized under the Squaliform order, which encompasses seven families in total, including Squalidae. The Squalidae family itself contains two separate genera: Cirrhigaleus and Squalus, numbering 37 species between the two.

References

Further reading 

 
 

 
Taxa named by Charles Lucien Bonaparte
Shark families
Extant Late Cretaceous first appearances